In enzymology, a tocopherol O-methyltransferase is an enzyme that catalyzes the chemical reaction

S-adenosyl-L-methionine + gamma-tocopherol  S-adenosyl-L-homocysteine + alpha-tocopherol

Thus, the two substrates of this enzyme are S-adenosyl methionine and gamma-tocopherol, whereas its two products are S-adenosylhomocysteine and alpha-tocopherol.

This enzyme belongs to the family of transferases, specifically those transferring one-carbon group methyltransferases.  The systematic name of this enzyme class is S-adenosyl-L-methionine:gamma-tocopherol 5-O-methyltransferase. This enzyme is also called gamma-tocopherol methyltransferase.  This enzyme participates in biosynthesis of steroids.

References

 

EC 2.1.1
Enzymes of unknown structure